Relief Inlet is a narrow inlet at the southwest corner of Terra Nova Bay. The feature is formed along a shear plane caused by differential ice movement near the coast of Victoria Land involving the north edge of Drygalski Ice Tongue and south extremities of the Nansen Ice Sheet. So named by the South Magnetic Polar Party, led by T.W.E. David, of the British Antarctic Expedition, 1907–09, because, after almost giving up hope of rescue, the Nimrod picked up the party here.

References

Inlets of Antarctica
Landforms of Victoria Land
Scott Coast